Trinidad Rifle Association was founded in 1879 and is the umbrella organization for sport shooting in Trinidad and Tobago, being a member of the international organizations:

 International Practical Shooting Confederation
 International Shooting Sport Federation
 International Confederation of Fullbore Rifle Associations
 National Rifle Association of the United Kingdom
 Commonwealth Games Federation

See also 
 Fullbore target rifle

References 

Regions of the International Practical Shooting Confederation
Sports organisations of Trinidad and Tobago
Rifle associations
Regions of the International Confederation of Fullbore Rifle Associations